Karabakh Economic Region is one of the 14 economic regions of Azerbaijan. It borders Iran to the south, as well as the economic regions of East Zangezur, Ganja-Dashkasan, Central Aran, and Mil-Mughan. The region consists of the districts of Aghjabadi, Aghdam, Barda, Fuzuli, Khojaly, Khojavend, Shusha, and Tartar, as well as the city of Khankendi (Stepanakert). Its population (including refugees and IDPs living outside the economic region in Azerbaijan) was estimated to be at 904.5 thousand people in January 2021.

History 
Karabakh Economic Region was established on 7 July 2021 as part of a reform of the economic region system of Azerbaijan. Its territory mostly corresponded to the Upper Karabakh Economic Region prior to 2021, which included the districts of Aghdam, Tartar, Khojavend, Khojaly, Shusha, Jabrayil, Fuzuli and the city of Khankendi.

References 

Economic regions of Azerbaijan